Egidijus Klumbys (born 2 September 1952 in Kaunas) is a Lithuanian politician. In 1990 he was among those who signed the Act of the Re-Establishment of the State of Lithuania.

References
Biography 

1952 births
Living people
Politicians from Kaunas
Members of the Seimas
21st-century Lithuanian politicians